Murmur of the Heart is a 1971 French comedy-drama film written, produced and directed by Louis Malle. It stars Lea Massari, Benoît Ferreux and Daniel Gélin. Written as Malle's semi-autobiography, the film tells a coming-of-age story about a 14-year-old boy (Ferreux) growing up in bourgeois surroundings in post-World War II Dijon, France, with a complex relationship with his Italian-born mother (Massari).

The film was screened at the 1971 Cannes Film Festival and was a box-office success in France. In the United States, it received positive reviews and a nomination for the Academy Award for Best Original Screenplay.

Plot
Laurent Chevalier is a 14-year-old boy living in Dijon in 1954 who loves jazz, always receives the highest grades in his class, and opposes the First Indochina War. He has an unloving father, Charles, a gynecologist; an affectionate Italian-born mother, Clara; and two older brothers, Thomas and Marc. Thomas and Marc are inveterate pranksters, while Laurent engages in taboos such as shoplifting and masturbation. Laurent also discovers that Clara has a lover, and upset by the adultery, runs to tell Charles, who, busy with his practice, angrily turns him away.

One night, Thomas and Marc take Laurent to a brothel, where Laurent loses his virginity to a prostitute, Freda, before they are disrupted by his drunken brothers. Upset, Laurent leaves for scouting camp, where he catches scarlet fever and is left with a heart murmur. Bedridden for a month, he is cared for and entertained by Clara and their maid, Augusta. Laurent's teacher at his Catholic school suggests that Laurent's illness has matured him, so that he has made progress in his studies, and urges Clara to treat him more like an adult.

As Laurent requires treatment at a sanatorium, he and Clara check into a hotel. Due to an error by Charles's secretary Solange, the hotel books both Clara and Laurent into a single room, and given that the hotel is completely full, no additional room is available. Laurent takes interest in two young girls at the hotel, Hélène and Daphne, and also spies on his mother in the bathtub. Though Laurent pursues Hélène, Hélène says she is not ready for sex; Laurent accuses her of being a lesbian. Clara temporarily leaves with her lover, but comes back distraught after their breakup; Laurent comforts her. After a night of heavy drinking on Bastille Day, Laurent and Clara have sex. Clara tells him afterward that this incest will not be repeated, but that they should not regret it. Laurent leaves their room, and after unsuccessfully trying to seduce Hélène, spends the night with Daphne.

Cast

Production
Malle wrote Murmur of the Heart partly as an autobiography. He said, "My passion for jazz, my curiosity about literature, the tyranny of my two elder brothers, how they introduced me to sex—this is pretty close to home." Malle also suffered from a heart murmur and shared a hotel room with his mother during treatment. Aside from that, the film is fictional, and takes place later than Malle's childhood. The humorous, earthy Italian mother is also a fictional character, based more on a friend's mother than his own. Malle asserted in interviews that the incest, in particular, is fictional. He claimed that in writing the script, he had no intention to include it, but ended up doing so as he explored an intense mother-son relationship.

The National Center of Cinematography objected to the screenplay's erotic scenes. Malle was surprised by the response. With the Censorship Board denying funding, the film was financed with the help of Mariane Film, a French subsidiary of Paramount Pictures. Given his love of jazz, and that Laurent steals a Charlie Parker album at the beginning of the film, Malle used Parker's music for the film score.

Of the incest scene, Massari said, "We shot that scene last and it was a great concern throughout the entire shoot. On the last day Malle said to me, 'do what you want, if it comes out well we'll keep it, if not we'll do as I say.' I acted on instinct, loading the fact that the woman was drunk, and the scene stayed as is."

Release
In France, the film had 2,652,870 admissions. It was screened at the Cannes Film Festival in May 1971 and also played at the New York Film Festival in October 1971.

On its re-release in the United States in 1989, it grossed $1,160,784. In Region 1, The Criterion Collection released the film on DVD in 2006, along with Malle's films Lacombe, Lucien and Au revoir les enfants.

Reception

Critical reception

Roger Ebert gave the film a four-star review, comparing it favorably to The 400 Blows, and wrote of the incest that Malle "takes the most highly charged subject matter you can imagine, and mutes it into simple affection." Judith Crist, writing for New York, praised the "remarkable" performances of Lea Massari, Benoît Ferreux and Daniel Gélin. Richard Schickel, writing for Life, said he had a "strange enthusiasm" for the film, which he felt demonstrated "taste, charm and the most winning sentiment." Variety staff complimented Ferreux and Massari's performances. In The New York Times, Roger Greenspun wrote that the film "isn't very good" and "that it could probably have been made with as much distinction by any of those directors, all equally anonymous, who specialize in urban romantic comedy (or tragedy) of a sophistication that is supposed to be peculiarly French." John Simon wrote that Murmur of the Heart treats incest charmingly but unsatisfactorily.

In 1989, Desson Howe wrote in The Washington Post that the film maintained its "fresh intelligence and delicacy" and that "Malle's world of sarcastic, upper-middle-class brats seems to be Murmur'''s most enduring creation." In 1990, Richard Stengel gave the film an A− in Entertainment Weekly, writing, "Almost everything about this coming-of-age story rings true, and Malle avoids any heavy-handed explanations of family behavior." Critic Pauline Kael called Massari "superb". In his 2002 Movie & Video Guide, Leonard Maltin gives the film three and a half stars, calling it a "fresh, intelligent, affectionately comic tale".

Director Wes Anderson has cited Murmur of the Heart as an influence, saying he loved the characters Laurent and Clara. Of the incest, he said, "The stuff between him and the mother feels more kind of romantic almost—but also taboo and scary in a way, which makes it even more seductive." Director Noah Baumbach has also named the film as an influence. Rotten Tomatoes counted 16 favorable reviews out of 17 for a score of 94%.

AccoladesMurmur of the Heart'' was nominated for Best Original Screenplay at the 1973 Academy Awards. It was also in competition, in the French part of the official selection, at the 1971 Cannes Film Festival.

References

External links
 
 
 
 Interview – archive.org
Murmur of the Heart: All in the Family an essay by Michael Sragow at the Criterion Collection

1970s sex comedy films
1970s coming-of-age films
1971 films
Adultery in films
Films about virginity
Films directed by Louis Malle
Films set in 1954
French comedy-drama films
French coming-of-age films
1970s French-language films
French sex comedy films
Incest in film
French teen films
German teen films
West German films
1971 comedy films
1970s French films
1970s German films